Ghosts – Italian Style is a 1967 Italian comedy film directed by Renato Castellani.

Plot
Pasquale Lojacono and his wife Maria are very poor, and do not have a roof over their head. One day they are invited to live free in an apartment of a building, considered by tenants cursed, because there dwells the ghost of an old Spanish nobleman. The two, however, accept coexistence with the spirit.

Cast
 Sophia Loren as Maria Lojacono
 Vittorio Gassman as Pasquale Lojacono
 Mario Adorf as Alfredo Mariano
 Aldo Giuffrè as Raffaele
 Margaret Lee as Sayonara
 Francis de Wolff as The Scotsman (as Francis De Wolffe)
 Francesco Tensi as Professor Santanna
 Augusta Merola as Anna
 Piera Degli Esposti
 Giovanni Tarallo
 Nietta Zocchi
 Valentino Macchi
 Lucio Dalla as The Musician
 Marcello Mastroianni as The Ghost (uncredited)

References

External links

 
 
 

1967 films
1967 comedy films
Italian comedy films
1960s Italian-language films
Italian films based on plays
Films based on works by Eduardo De Filippo
Films set in Naples
Films directed by Renato Castellani
Metro-Goldwyn-Mayer films
Films with screenplays by Tonino Guerra
Films produced by Carlo Ponti
Lux Film films
Italian ghost films
1960s Italian films